Firefly Lane is an American drama streaming television series created by Maggie Friedman for Netflix. The series is based on the novel of the same name by Kristin Hannah. The series premiered on February 3, 2021, and navigates the lives of two teenage girls in the 1970s, all the way through to their adulthood in the mid 2000s. In May 2021, the series was renewed for a second season. In October 2022, it was announced that the second season will be its final season and will consist of 16 episodes, split into two parts. The first part of the second season was released on December 2, 2022, and the second part is set to be released on April 27, 2023.

Cast and characters

Main
 Katherine Heigl as Tully Hart, a famous host of a daytime talk show known as The Girlfriend Hour
 Ali Skovbye as Young teenage Tully
 London Robertson as Young Tully 1970 
 Sarah Chalke as Kate Mularkey, Tully's best friend since they were 14 years old and a housewife who is trying to get back in the workforce while going through a divorce
 Roan Curtis as Young teenage Kate
 Ben Lawson as Johnny Ryan, Kate's husband and the producer of The Girlfriend Hour
 Beau Garrett as Cloud, Tully's free-spirited drug-addicted single mother
 Yael Yurman as Marah Ryan, Kate and Johnny's teenage daughter
 Ignacio Serricchio as Danny Diaz (season 2)

Recurring

 Brandon Jay McLaren as Travis, a widower whose daughter goes to the same school as Marah and finds a connection with Kate
 Jon Ecker as Max Brody, Tully's love interest
 Chelah Horsdal as Margie, Kate's mother
 Paul McGillion as Bud, Kate's father	
 Jenna Rosenow as Kimber Watts, an editor at Seattle Digest and Kate's boss
 Leo Rano as Leon, Cloud's boyfriend in the 1970s
 Brendan Taylor as Mutt, the cameraman at local news station KPOC Tacoma and Kate's love interest in the 1980s
 Jason Mckinnon as Sean, Kate's closeted older brother
 Quinn Lord as Sean '74
 Synto Misati as Robbie '74
 Kirsten Robek as Carol, a KPOC Tacoma anchor
 Andres Joseph as Gideon Vega, a photographer at Seattle Digest
 Patrick Sabongui as Chad Wiley, Tully's love interest in the 1980s who was also her college professor
 Tara Wilson as Julia, Sean's wife
 Jolene Purdy as Justine Jordan (season 2), Tully's new talent agent
 India de Beaufort as Charlie (season 2)
 Greg Germann as Benedict Binswanger (season 2), a wealthy businessman who is running for governor of the state of Washington whom Tully and Danny are covering for a story. He came from a family who owned a logging company known as Bincorp.
 Forrest Anthony as Parker Binswanger, (credited ambiguously as "Teenage Boy" in season 1) Benedict's kinder, more sensitive brother and Tully's father.
 Chris McNally as Mr. Waverly (season 2)

Special guest star
 Martin Donovan as Wilson King, a famous TV producer

Episodes

Series overview

Season 1 (2021)

Season 2 (2022)

Production

Development
On February 22, 2019, it was announced that Netflix had given the production a series order for a first season consisting of ten episodes. The series was created by Maggie Friedman who was also expected to executive produce alongside Stephanie Germain, Katherine Heigl, and Lee Rose. On May 26, 2021, Netflix renewed the series for a second season. On October 3, 2022, it was reported that the second season will be its final season which will consist of 16 episodes, splitting into two parts.

Casting
On July 10, 2019, Katherine Heigl was cast in a lead role. In August 2019, Ben Lawson, Sarah Chalke, Beau Garrett had been cast in starring roles. In September 2019, Ali Skovbye and Roan Curtis were cast to play the teenage versions of Heigl's and Chalke's characters, Tully and Kate, respectively. In the same month, Yael Yurman was cast as a series regular while Jon Ecker and Brandon Jay McLaren were cast in recurring capacities. On December 17, 2019, Patrick Sabongui and Brendan Taylor joined the cast in recurring roles. On February 11, 2020, Jenna Rosenow was cast in a recurring role. On September 21, 2021, Ignacio Serricchio joined the cast as new series regular while Greg Germann, India de Beaufort, and Jolene Purdy were cast in recurring roles for the second season. On February 11, 2022, Chris McNally was cast in a recurring capacity for the second season.

Filming
Principal photography for the first season began on September 17, 2019, and ended on January 21, 2020, in Burnaby, British Columbia. Vincent De Paula is the cinematographer for the series. Filming for the second season began on August 30, 2021, and concluded on April 28, 2022.

Release
On October 14, 2020, an official teaser was released as well as first look images. The series premiered on February 3, 2021. The first nine episodes of second season were released on December 2, 2022, and the final seven are set to be released on April 27, 2023.

Reception

Audience viewership
For the week of February 1 to 7, Firefly Lane  was ranked number one in the Nielsen ratings, who announced that the show had been viewed for a total of 1.3 billion minutes. The following week, it was ranked number one in the Nielsen ratings again, with a total of 1.288 billion minutes of viewing. On April 20, 2021, Netflix announced that 49 million people watched the series in its first 28 days after its release.

Critical response

For the first season, review aggregator Rotten Tomatoes reported an approval rating of 47% based on 30 critic reviews, with an average rating of 5.53/10. The website's critics consensus reads, "Firefly Lane has some solid ideas and a winning pair in Katherine Heigl and Sarah Chalke—if only the writing could live up to all that potential." Metacritic gave the first season a weighted average score of 57 out of 100 based on 21 critic reviews, indicating "mixed or average reviews".

Judy Berman of Time wrote, "By most metrics, Firefly Lane is simply not a good show. Yet despite its many limitations, there's something lovable about it." Joel Keller of Decider said, "The chemistry between Sarah Chalke and Katherine Heigl will carry Firefly Lane."

References

External links

2020s American drama television series
2021 American television series debuts
English-language Netflix original programming
Television shows filmed in Burnaby
Television series about television
Television series set in the 1970s
Television series set in the 1980s
Television series set in the 2000s
Television shows based on American novels
Television shows set in Seattle
Works about friendship